Avec pas d'casque is a folk band from Montreal, Quebec, Canada, composed of members Stéphane Lafleur, Joël Vaudreuil, Nicolas Moussette, and Mathieu Charbonneau. The band's French name literally means "with no helmet" and derives from an expression referring to hockey players who don't wear helmets, popularized by Jean Dion, a Québécois sports journalist for Le Devoir.

History
Avec pas d'casque began as a duo, made up of Lafleur and Vaudreuil, who recorded a self-produced album in 2004, which they sold at their concerts. The group's first official album, Trois chaudières de sang, was released on Dare to Care Records on May 9, 2006. In 2008, after gaining a third member in Nicolas Moussette, the band released their second album, Dans la nature jusqu'au cou, on Grosse Boîte, the French division of Dare to Care. After adding a fourth member, Mathieu Charbonneau, Avec pas d'casque released their third album, Astronomie, on March 20, 2012. It was subsequently long-listed for the 2012 Polaris Music Prize, and was a Juno Award nominee for Francophone Album of the Year at the Juno Awards of 2013.

Lafleur is also a film director and screenwriter, whose films have included Continental, a Film Without Guns and You're Sleeping Nicole (Tu dors Nicole), while Vaudreuil is an animator whose short film The River's Lazy Flow (Le courant faible de la rivière) won the Jutra Award for Best Animated Short Film at the 16th Jutra Awards in 2014. Charbonneau has also worked in film as a score composer, including the films A Colony (Une colonie), Goddess of the Fireflies (La déesse des mouches à feu) and Viking.

Members
 Stéphane Lafleur: voice, guitar, ukulele, kazoo, flute, synthesizer
 Nicolas Moussette: bass, lap steel guitar
 Mathieu Charbonneau: baryton, synthesizer
 Joël Vaudreuil: drums, autoharp, kazoo

Discography
 Avec pas d'casque (2004), Independent
 Trois Chaudières de Sang (2006), Dare to Care Records
 Dans La Nature Jusqu'Au Cou (2008), Grosse Boîte
 Astronomie (2012), Grosse Boîte
 Dommage Que Tu Sois Pris (2013), Grosse Boîte
 Effets Spéciaux (2016), Grosse Boîte

References

Canadian folk music groups
Musical groups established in 2004
2004 establishments in Quebec